The Acme Sportsman was a two-seat parasol wing sportsplane built in the United States in 1928 by Acme Aircraft Corporation, a company from Rockford, Illinois. It was of conventional taildragger configuration with open cockpits in tandem and folding wings. It was designed by Edward Stalker of the University of Michigan.

Variants
Acme Model 21 Sportsman
Production aircraft powered by Velie M-5 engines
Smith O
One aircraft re-engined with a 100hp Kinner K-5
Para-monoplane
The other aircraft re-engined with a 45hp Szekely SR-5

Specifications (Sportsman model 21)

See also

References

 

1920s United States sport aircraft
Parasol-wing aircraft
Aircraft first flown in 1929